Craig Charles Glendinning Henderson (born 24 June 1987) is a New Zealand footballer who last played for Indy Eleven as a midfielder. His hometown is Stokes Valley, Lower Hutt. He attended Taita College, Lower Hutt where he was Head Boy, Dux and Sportsman of the Year in 2004.

Career

Dartmouth College
Henderson completed his Dartmouth College football career with 67 games played, starting 53 of those. He tallied 53 career points on 20 goals and 13 assists and scored eight game-winners. Henderson earned All-Ivy and All-Northeast second team honors his senior year despite an injury that held him to just 11 games played that fall. After being named the unanimous Ivy Player of the Year and an All-America selection in 2008, Henderson was cut down just nine games into this season. As a senior, he posted 12 points on four goals and four assists.

Club

Move to Sweden
In August 2009, Henderson spent a week training with the Swedish top team Kalmar FF. Although he was not signed by Kalmar, he made a good impression and in an interview post Henderson's trial, a Kalmar FF spokesperson mentioned the possibility of signing Henderson in future.

Mjällby AIF
In December 2009 Henderson signed a three-year contract with the Swedish 1st Division Club, Mjällby AIF, who were promoted from the Swedish 2nd Division at the conclusion of the preceding season. He began his appointment with the club in January 2010. Specific terms of the contract are undisclosed, but include a signing bonus, salary and other stipends.

On 26 February 2010, Henderson suffered a knee injury in pre-season training with Mjällby AIF which prevented him from making his All Whites debut against Mexico the following week. A scan later revealed a ruptured Anterior cruciate ligament which required surgery, keeping Henderson out of all football for six to eight months, ending his hopes of representing New Zealand at the 2010 FIFA World Cup. After several setbacks with his injury he finally got to make his league debut in August 2012 against IFK Göteborg.

Stabæk
In February 2015, Henderson signed for Norwegian Tippeligaen side Stabæk Fotball.

After over a year out injured, Henderson made his return with Stabæk's second team in July 2015. Going on to join Mjøndalen IF on loan for the remainder of the 2015 season in August.

Indy Eleven
In February 2017, NASL team Indy Eleven announced the signing of Henderson for the 2017 season.

International career
Henderson has achieved national representation in all age-grade teams including the New Zealand national under-23 football team who participated in the 2008 Summer Olympics in Beijing. He played in all of New Zealand's qualifying matches and in New Zealand's three group matches against China (1-1), Brazil (0-5) and Belgium (0-1).

Henderson also competed at the 2007 FIFA Under 20 World Cup with captain and fellow Dartmouth College teammate Dan Keat.

On 9 February 2010, Henderson was officially selected in a 17-strong New Zealand squad to face Mexico in an International friendly in Los Angeles on 3 March 2010, however, a knee injury sustained while training with his club side one week from the game ruled him out of the match.

Henderson received a further All Whites callup on 17 May 2011, as part of a 23-man squad to play friendlies against Mexico and Australia in June.

After returning from his long term injury and getting plenty of playing time for his club team, Henderson finally made his debut for the senior New Zealand team on 15 October 2013 in a friendly against Trinidad and Tobago.

Career statistics

Club

International

References

External links
 
 Craig Henderson profile at NZ Football
 http://www.barometern.se/sporten/kalmar_ff/kalmar-ff-borjar-jobba-med-nya-brasseforwards(1638330).gm
 http://www.maif.se/aktuellt_lasmer.lasso?id=4973&menu=10&menu2=27
 
 

1987 births
Living people
Association football midfielders
Dartmouth Big Green men's soccer players
New Zealand association footballers
New Zealand international footballers
Sportspeople from Lower Hutt
New Zealand expatriate association footballers
Footballers at the 2008 Summer Olympics
Olympic association footballers of New Zealand
Dartmouth College alumni
Mjällby AIF players
Team Wellington players
Stabæk Fotball players
Mjøndalen IF players
GAIS players
Eliteserien players
Superettan players
Indy Eleven players
New Zealand expatriate sportspeople in Norway
Expatriate footballers in Norway
North American Soccer League players
Allsvenskan players